BOM or bom may refer to:

Business
Bank One Mauritius, a commercial bank based in Mauritius
Bill of materials, a list of materials and parts needed to manufacture a product

Science and technology
 Bureau of Meteorology, Australia
 BOM (psychedelic) (3,4,5,beta-tetramethoxyphenethylamine), a psychedelic drug
 BOM (file format), a file format used in OS X installer packages
 Browser Object Model, the objects exposed by a Web browser
 Byte order mark (U+FEFF and others), a Unicode character

People
 Klaas Bom (born 1937), Dutch engineer
 Lars Bom (born 1961), Danish actor
 Bom (singer), South Korean singer

Other uses
 Barrel of Monkeys Productions, a Chicago-based arts-education organization
 Bom language, an African language
 Bom people, an ethnic group in Bangladesh
 Builder's Old Measurement of a ship's cargo carrying capacity, England, 1650-1848
 Bureau of Mines (Republic of China)
 Berom language (ISO 639 code: bom), a Plateau language of Nigeria
 Bromborough railway station, Merseyside, England, station code
 Chhatrapati Shivaji International Airport, Mumbai, India, IATA airport code

See also 
 Bomb, an explosive
 Baum, surname